The Willimantic Footbridge is a pedestrian bridge in the Willimantic section of Windham, Connecticut.  Built in 1906, it extends from Main Street southward, across Riverside Drive, railroad tracks, and the Willimantic River, connecting downtown Willimantic to the residential area south of the river.  It is one of a small number of pedestrian bridges built in the early 20th century to survive in the state.  It was listed on the National Register of Historic Places in 1979.

Description and history
The north end of the Willimantic Footbridge is located near the eastern end of its downtown commercial district, between North and Church Streets on Main Street. The trusses are mainly mounted on steel trestle piers, although one is of granite rubblestone. The Main Street abutment is built out of ashlar granite blocks, while that on the south bank of the river is rubblestone. The trusses are all through trusses of three different types, with two heavy spans spanning the longest sections, across the river and the tracks of the Central Vermont Railroad. Lighter spans cross the Providence and Worcester Railroad tracks and Riverside Drive, with an even lighter span at the northernmost end.

The bridge was built in 1906 to connect the commercial core to the southern residential part of Willimantic.  A bridge was first proposed for this area in 1877, but no action was taken until the early 20th century, when city leaders were seeking to create a downtown area more suitable for pedestrian use. This bridge is a popular site in Willimantic.  It is the only footbridge in New England to span both a river and a railroad.

See also
National Register of Historic Places listings in Windham County, Connecticut
List of bridges on the National Register of Historic Places in Connecticut

References

External links

Bridges completed in 1906
Willimantic, Connecticut
Bridges on the National Register of Historic Places in Connecticut
Pedestrian bridges in the United States
Bridges in Windham County, Connecticut
Bridges over the Willimantic River
Bridges in Connecticut
National Register of Historic Places in Windham County, Connecticut
Historic district contributing properties in Connecticut
Pedestrian bridges on the National Register of Historic Places
Transportation in Windham, Connecticut
Steel bridges in the United States
1906 establishments in Connecticut